The Nerve was a free Canadian monthly music magazine. It was founded in 1998, and was distributed in Vancouver, Victoria, Bellingham, Seattle, Edmonton, Calgary, Winnipeg, Toronto, and Montreal. The last issue was published in December 2007 (featuring Vancouver band Black Mountain on its cover), and has been on hiatus ever since.  No official announcement has yet been made regarding this halt.

References

External links
 The Nerve

1999 establishments in British Columbia
2007 disestablishments in British Columbia
Monthly magazines published in Canada
Music magazines published in Canada
Defunct magazines published in Canada
Free magazines
Magazines established in 1999
Magazines disestablished in 2007
Magazines published in Vancouver